Schmehl is a surname. Notable people with the surname include:

Carl Schmehl (born 1968), American theatre director and producer
Jeffrey L. Schmehl (born 1955), American judge

See also
Schmehl Peak, a mountain of Oates Land, Antarctica

Surnames of German origin